Kit Carson Mesa is the name of a mesa near Rayado in Colfax County, New Mexico. New Mexico State Road 21 runs adjacent to the mesa. It is named after Kit Carson, who is said to have been the first English speaking traveler to visit the town of Rayado.

Further reading

See also
Philmont Scout Ranch
Miami, New Mexico

References

External links

Mesas of New Mexico
Landforms of Colfax County, New Mexico